The Central District of Mahallat County is a district (bakhsh) in Mahallat County, Markazi Province, Iran. At the 2006 census, its population was 48,458, in 14,139 families.  The District has two cities: Mahallat and Nimvar.  The District has two rural districts (dehestan): Baqerabad Rural District and Khurheh Rural District.

References 

Mahallat County
Districts of Markazi Province